Colin Ewart Gunton (19 January 1941 – 6 May 2003) was an English Reformed systematic theologian. He made contributions to the doctrine of creation and the doctrine of the Trinity. He was Professor of Christian Doctrine at King's College, London, from 1984 and co-founder with Christoph Schwoebel of the Research Institute for Systematic Theology in 1988. Gunton was actively involved in the United Reformed Church in the United Kingdom where he had been a minister since 1972.

Biography 
Colin Ewart Gunton was born on 19 January 1941 in Nottingham, England. He first studied literae humaniores at Hertford College, Oxford, and graduated with a [[Bachelor of Arts|Bachelor  degree in 1964, the same year he married the schoolteacher Jennifer Osgathorpe. He then began his study of theology, and a year later received a Master of Arts degree from Mansfield College, Oxford. He then began his doctoral work under the direction of Robert Jenson, which took six years because he began teaching two years into his doctoral program as he became Lecturer in Philosophy of Religion at King's College, London, in 1969.  His dissertation was a study of the doctrine of God in the thought of Charles Hartshorne and Karl Barth, which was completed in 1973.

Gunton was ordained in the United Reformed Church in 1972. He became an Associate Minister of the Brentwood United Reformed Church in 1975, a position which he held until his death. Gunton was appointed Lecturer in Systematic Theology at King's College in 1980, and in 1984 became Professor of Christian Doctrine, later becoming the Dean of Faculty from 1988 to 1990.  He also served as Head of the Department of Theology and Religious Studies from 1993 to 1997.  Gunton founded and directed the Research Institute in Systematic Theology which drew distinguished scholars and many graduate students from around the world.  In 1992 he delivered the Bampton Lectures at the University of Oxford, (published as The One, the Three and the Many) and delivered the Warfield Lectures at Princeton Theological Seminary in 1993.  He also co-founded the International Journal of Systematic Theology with John Bainbridge Webster and Ralph del Colle in 1999.

Gunton was awarded honorary doctorates by the University of London (1993), the University of Aberdeen (1999), and shortly before his death, the University of Oxford (2003).  He was also made a Fellow of King's College. Gunton died on 6 May 2003.

Writings 
Gunton's most influential work was on the doctrines of creation and the Trinity. One of his most important books is The One, the Three and the Many: God, Creation and the Culture of Modernity (1993), which has been described as "a profound analysis of the paradoxes and contradictions of Modernity." The One, the Three and the Many remains a "majestical survey of the western intellectual tradition and a penetrating analysis of the modern condition."

Published works

Major works 
Becoming and Being: The Doctrine of God in Charles Hartshorne and Karl Barth (1978, 2nd Ed. 2001)
Yesterday and Today: A Study of Continuities in Christology (1983, 2nd Ed. 1997)
Enlightenment and Alienation: An Essay Towards a Trinitarian Theology (1985)
Actuality of Atonement: A Study of Metaphor, Rationality and the Christian Tradition (1988) 
The Promise of Trinitarian Theology (1991, 2nd Ed. 1997) 
Christ and Creation (1992)  | 
The One, the Three and the Many: God, Creation and the Culture of Modernity (1993) 
A Brief Theology of Revelation (1995)  | 
Theology Through the Theologians: Essays 1972-1995 (1996)
The Triune Creator: A Historical and Systematic Study (1998) 
Intellect and Action (2000, T & T Clark))
Theology Through Preaching (2001, T & T Clark)
The Christian Faith: An Introduction to Christian Doctrine (2002) 
Act and Being: Toward A Theology of the Divine Attributes (2002)
Father, Son and Holy Spirit: Toward A Fully Trinitarian Theology (2003)
Theologian as Preacher: Further Sermons from Colin Gunton (2007, T & T Clark)
The Barth Lectures (2007, T & T Clark)

Edited works 
On Being the Church (1988)
Persons, Divine and Human (1991)
God and Freedom: Essays in Historical and Systematic Theology (1995)
The Doctrine of Creation (1997)
The Cambridge Companion to Christian Doctrine (1997)
Time, Trinity and Church: A Response to the theology of Robert Jenson (2000)
The Practice of Theology: A Reader (2002) edited with Murray Rae and Stephen Holmes
The Theology of Reconciliation (2003)

References

Footnotes

Bibliography

Further reading

External links 
Guardian Obituary by Stephen Holmes
Society for the Study of Theology
 Profile: Colin E. Gunton, by Graham McFarlane
 Colin Gunton (1941 sic - 2003), by Robert Jenson

1941 births
2003 deaths
20th-century Calvinist and Reformed ministers
20th-century Calvinist and Reformed theologians
20th-century British philosophers
20th-century English theologians
Academics of King's College London
Alumni of Hertford College, Oxford
Alumni of Mansfield College, Oxford
Calvinist and Reformed philosophers
English Calvinist and Reformed ministers
English Calvinist and Reformed theologians
English philosophers
Fellows of King's College London
People from Nottingham
Philosophers of religion
United Reformed Church ministers